Autódromo Internacional Ayrton Senna is a motorsports circuit located in Caruaru, Brazil. Opened in 1992, it hosted motor racing events for the Copa Truck, Fórmula Truck and defunct Formula Three Sudamericana series.

Lap records

The official fastest lap records at the Autódromo Internacional Ayrton Senna (Caruaru) are listed as:

References

External links
Track information

Ayrton Senna
Sports venues in Pernambuco
Things named after Ayrton Senna